Antonina Wyrzykowska, née Karwowska (12 August 1916 – 29 November 2011) was a Polish Righteous Among the Nations known for helping Jews who fled the Jedwabne pogrom. She was also decorated with the Commander's Cross of the Order of Polonia Restituta by Poland's President Lech Kaczyński. Her husband, Aleksander Wyrzykowski, was also honoured as Righteous Among the Nations.

References

External links
 Jedwabne – A Noble Family in the Midst of Murder and Betrayal: Aleksander & Antonina Wyrzykowski, at Yad Vashem website

Polish Righteous Among the Nations
People from Łomża County
1916 births
2011 deaths
Commanders of the Order of Polonia Restituta
Jedwabne pogrom